The 2021 ABSA Cup was the 14th edition of the annual knock-out competition in Zambian football contested by teams from its top tiers and the second to be sponsored by Absa Group Limited following its completed acquisition of the African assets and operations of Barclays in 2018.

The top six teams from the Super League and the top two teams from the National Division One, after 17 games of the 2020/21 season qualified for the tournament.
As the 2020 edition was cancelled due to the COVID-19 pandemic, the 2019 champions, ZESCO United are defending champions.

Knockout stage 
The qualified teams were Forest Rangers, Kabwe Warriors, Lusaka Dynamos, Prison Leopards, Zanaco F.C., ZESCO United from the Super League together with Kansanshi Dynamos and Konkola Blades from National Division One.

The draw was held at the Radisson Blu Hotel in Lusaka on the 4th of March:

Bracket

Final

Prize awards
Best player of the tournament was awarded to Kelvin Mubanga Kampamba from ZESCO United.

Best coach of the tournament was awarded to Wedson Nyirenda from Lusaka Dynamos.

References

Football competitions in Zambia
2020–21 in Zambian football
2021 in Zambian sport